Black Sabbath were an English heavy metal band from Aston, Birmingham. Formed in September 1968 under the initial name Earth, the group's first lineup included lead vocalist Ozzy Osbourne, guitarist Tony Iommi, bassist Geezer Butler and drummer Bill Ward. They changed their name to Black Sabbath in August 1969 and the lineup remained stable until April 1979, when Osbourne was fired. Subsequently, the band went through numerous personnel changes over the years, with Iommi remaining the only constant member. The original lineup reunited in 2011, although Ward soon exited and was replaced on tour by Tommy Clufetos until the band's retirement in 2017.

In 2006 Ronnie James Dio, Iommi, Butler, and Ward reunited as Heaven & Hell, a band which focused on performing Dio-era Black Sabbath music. The new name was intended to differentiate between the Osbourne and Dio-era lineups. Ward was soon replaced by Vinny Appice. Heaven & Hell released one studio album, The Devil You Know, before Dio died of stomach cancer on 16 May 2010.

History

1968–1985
Black Sabbath formed in 1968, taking members from two other local bands – guitarist Tony Iommi and drummer Bill Ward from Mythology, and vocalist Ozzy Osbourne and bassist Geezer Butler from Rare Breed. Initially known as The Polka Tulk Blues Band, the group's name was changed in September 1968 to Earth, before they became Black Sabbath in August 1969 after being confused with another British act of the same name. After seven commercially and critically successful albums, Osbourne left abruptly in September 1977 to pursue a solo career. He was replaced by Dave Walker, although by the following January he had returned to the band. After one more album, Never Say Die!, Osbourne was fired on 27 April 1979, due to his reliance on alcohol and drugs, and his reluctance to work on a new album.

Osbourne was replaced by former Rainbow vocalist Ronnie James Dio in June 1979. Butler chose to leave shortly after his arrival, with Geoff Nicholls taking his place in mid-July before Dio's former bandmate Craig Gruber joined and Nicholls moved to keyboards and guitar. Recording began with Gruber, but Butler returned in November and performed all bass parts on Heaven and Hell. Ward abruptly left partway through the album's promotional tour after a show on 19 August 1980, with Vinny Appice enlisted to take his place from 31 August. In November 1982, after disagreements over the mixing of Live Evil, Dio and Appice left Black Sabbath and formed Dio together. The following February, the band replaced Dio with former Deep Purple frontman Ian Gillan, and brought back original drummer Ward.

After recording Born Again, Ward was forced to leave again in the summer of 1983 due to his continuing problems with alcohol abuse. He was replaced for the Born Again Tour by Electric Light Orchestra drummer Bev Bevan. Gillan departed after the tour. He was briefly replaced by former Steeler vocalist Ron Keel, although this was short-lived due to disagreements between the band and their new producer Spencer Proffer, which saw plans for a new album fall through. After Keel, a newly sober Ward returned to the band and they briefly worked with David "Donut" Donato on vocals. However, this also failed to result in a new album or tour dates, Butler left in response to the personnel changes, and the band remained inactive until the following year. Iommi subsequently began working on a planned solo album in early 1985.

1985–1997
For his planned solo album, Iommi began working with bassist Gordon Copley and drummer Eric Singer, then members of Lita Ford's backing band (Iommi's fiancée at the time). After a few months, Copley returned to working with Ford, and Dave Spitz was brought in as his replacement. On 13 July 1985, the original lineup of Black Sabbath reunited for a one-off appearance at Live Aid, performing the songs "Children of the Grave", "Iron Man" and "Paranoid". Iommi then returned to working on his solo album, for which he enlisted former Trapeze and Deep Purple vocalist Glenn Hughes in July. However, after pressure from his American record label Warner Bros. Records, Iommi was forced to credit Seventh Star to "Black Sabbath featuring Tony Iommi" upon its release in January 1986.

Returning on the Seventh Star Tour under the original moniker, the band were forced into another change of vocalist on 26 March 1986, when Hughes suffered an injury in a fight with manager John Downey which left him unable to sing. He was replaced by Ray Gillen, who debuted on 29 March. During the production of their next album, The Eternal Idol, the lineup of Black Sabbath changed multiple times – first, Bob Daisley replaced Spitz on 30 September 1986, before leaving on 11 November after completing his bass parts; next, Singer left on 1 January 1987, with his drum parts completed; and finally, Tony Martin replaced Gillen on 1 March. Around the time of Martin's arrival, Bevan also returned to the band. Preparing for shows in July, the band briefly rehearsed with original bassist Butler, although within a few days he had left again and Spitz was brought back in his place. Bevan left after one show, objecting to upcoming dates at Sun City, South Africa, and was replaced for the shows by Terry Chimes.

After the Sun City shows, Spitz left the band again on 15 August 1987; he was later replaced by Jo Burt on 1 October. Burt remained a member early the next year, but had left by the time the band played a charity show on 29 May 1988, at which Nicholls filled in on bass. By August, the band had started work on new album Headless Cross with drummer Cozy Powell and session bassist Laurence Cottle. Butler was slated to return for the subsequent touring cycle, but he ultimately joined Osbourne's solo band and instead Neil Murray was hired in May 1989. This lineup remained stable for more than a year, releasing Tyr in 1990 and touring until the end of the year.

After the tour in promotion of Tyr, Butler returned to the band. Despite rumours of an original reunion lineup, it was Dio who took over from Martin on vocals in January 1991. Within a few months, however, Martin was reinstated after Dio and Iommi disagreed over the vocalist's desire to bring back Vinny Appice and reunite the Mob Rules lineup. Dio eventually did return with Appice later in the year, replacing Martin and Cozy Powell respectively, and the lineup released Dehumanizer in 1992. At the end of the resulting tour, however, Dio left after refusing to perform at two shows in November supporting original vocalist Osbourne, who had announced his retirement. Rob Halford, who had recently left Judas Priest, filled in for the dates. After the original lineup reunited onstage at the second show for four songs, plans were set for a full reformation with Osbourne and Ward the next year.

The reunion with Osbourne and Ward ultimately fell through, and in early 1993 the band brought back Martin as frontman. With Appice also gone after the Dehumanizer Tour, the band auditioned drummers and hired Bobby Rondinelli in March. Cross Purposes was released and promoted on a short concert tour in 1994, after which Butler left the band again. Rondinelli was replaced by Ward for the final leg of the tour in South America, but the drummer chose to leave again when Butler departed. Butler and Ward were replaced by returning members Murray and Powell, respectively, marking a reunion of the Tyr lineup. The band toured in promotion of new album Forbidden in 1995, although Powell was replaced by Rondinelli partway through the tour in August. After the conclusion of the tour, Black Sabbath went on hiatus during 1996 as Iommi began work on a new solo album.

1997–2017
In March 1997, the long-awaited reunion of Osbourne, Iommi and Butler was announced for the Ozzfest tour, starting in May. Ward, however, was not invited to join; his place was instead taken by Faith No More drummer Mike Bordin. For a rescheduled show on 1 July, Shannon Larkin of Godsmack took over from Bordin, who was unavailable. Ward eventually returned in November for a pair of shows the following month, which were recorded and released alongside two new studio tracks on Reunion in 1998. A short European tour was scheduled for June 1998, however just before it began Ward suffered a minor heart attack. Appice was brought in to replace him for the shows. Ward returned later in the year, with a tour in support of Reunion taking place in 1999. After another hiatus while members worked on solo projects, Sabbath joined Ozzfest again in 2001, although a later tour was cancelled when Osbourne was ordered by his label Epic Records to complete work on his new album Down to Earth.

After another hiatus, Black Sabbath returned in 2004 with new touring keyboardist Adam Wakeman. Halford reprised his role as substitute vocalist for a show on 26 August, after Osbourne was unable to sing due to bronchitis. More tour dates followed in 2005, including another appearance on the Ozzfest tour, before Iommi began working with Dio in early 2006 on new tracks for an upcoming compilation titled The Dio Years. Butler and Ward were initially named as the rhythm section completing the project.  At Iommi's behest, the group rebranded themselves as Heaven & Hell to differentiate this incarnation from the Osbourne-fronted Black Sabbath which was then only on a hiatus.
Ward, would later decline to be the band's drummer before they recorded, citing musical differences. By December, the reunion had evolved into a full reformation of the Mob Rules lineup of the band with Appice taking over Ward's duties, the band was joined on tour by Dio keyboardist Scott Warren, taking Nicholls original role. The band adopted the moniker Heaven & Hell accordingly. During this time, the official lineup of Black Sabbath continued to be Osbourne, Iommi, Butler and Ward, as it was assured by representatives of the band that Heaven & Hell was a separate project.

Heaven & Hell released their only studio album, The Devil You Know, and remained active until Dio died of stomach cancer on 16 May 2010, on 24 July 2010 Jorn Lande and a returning Glenn Hughes and performed with Iommi, Butler, Appice and Warren at the Dio Tribute Concert. On 11 November 2011, the original lineup announced at a press conference that they would be reuniting for their first studio album since 1978, as well as an accompanying concert tour. However, on 3 February 2012, Ward announced that he would not be joining his bandmates unless he received a "signable contract ... that reflects some dignity and respect toward me as an original member of the band". The drummer confirmed his departure in May, after failing to reach an agreement that suited him. Five days after the announcement, the band played their first live show since 2005 in Birmingham, with Tommy Clufetos – the drummer in Osbourne's solo band – in place of Ward.

Former Rage Against the Machine and Audioslave drummer Brad Wilk was enlisted to perform on new album 13, which was released in June 2013. Clufetos remained for the album's promotional touring cycle. On 3 September 2015, it was announced that the band would embark on a tour dubbed The End throughout 2016 and 2017, which would serve as their "farewell tour". Another studio album was initially announced in 2014, however this was later scrapped. The final studio recordings released by the band were four outtakes from the 13 sessions, which were issued alongside four live recordings on the EP The End in January 2016. The final Black Sabbath show took place on 4 February 2017 at the Genting Arena in Birmingham, which was recorded for The End of the End documentary film and The End: Live in Birmingham album and video release. On 7 March 2017, Black Sabbath's disbandment was officially confirmed.

Band members

Original members

Subsequent members

Touring and session musicians

Substitutes

Timeline

Recording Timeline

Line-ups

Bibliography

References

External links
Black Sabbath official website

Black Sabbath